Sad Days, Lonely Nights is an album by Junior Kimbrough, released in 1994. It was recorded live in Kimbrough's club, without an audience.

Track listing 

"Sad Days, Lonely Nights" – 4:22 
"Lonesome in My Home" – 4:34  
"Lord, Have Mercy on Me" – 9:54
"Crawling King Snake" – 4:50
"My Mind Is Rambling" – 6:21
"Leaving in the Morning" – 7:19 (HBO series Boardwalk Empire song for lead and trail)   
"Old Black Mattie" – 6:40
"I'm in Love" – 5:04 
"Pull Your Clothes Off" – 4:28
"I'm Gonna Have to Leave Here" – 6:35 
"Sad Days, Lonely Nights" – 5:33

References

Junior Kimbrough albums
1994 live albums
Fat Possum Records albums